The 2011 Notre Dame Fighting Irish football team represented the University of Notre Dame in the 2011 NCAA Division I FBS football season. The team was coached by Brian Kelly and played its home games at Notre Dame Stadium in South Bend, Indiana. They compete as an independent. They finished the season 8–5. They were invited to the Champs Sports Bowl where they were defeated by Florida State 18–14.

Pre-season

Coaching changes
Kerry Cooks took over the cornerback position after coaching the outside linebackers the previous season. Defensive coordinator Bob Diaco, who also coaches the inside linebackers, will coach the entire linebacking corps moving forward. Chuck Martin will focus solely on the safeties, while presumably assuming his role as the program’s recruiting coordinator.

Player changes

Departing players
Star tight end Kyle Rudolph chose to forgo his final year of eligibility, and enter the 2011 NFL Draft. The Irish also lost a number of important seniors, including four-year starter defensive lineman Ian Williams, linebackers Kerry Neal and Brian Smith, cornerback Darrin Walls, running backs Robert Hughes and Armando Allen, Wide Receiver Duval Kamara, and offensive lineman Matt Romine and Chris Stewart, all to graduation. Redshirt junior quarterback Nate Montana left the program in early February 2011, and transferred to the University of Montana. Junior guard Alex Bullard transferred to his hometown state of Tennessee and will play for the University of Tennessee, citing the desire to be closer to home following the loss of a family member.

Recruiting
With his first full recruiting class, Brian Kelly added 23 prospects to the football team, including the addition of five early-enrollees: defensive end Aaron Lynch, outside linebacker Ishaq Williams, offensive lineman Brad Carrico, quarterback Everett Golson, and kicker Kyle Brindza.

Outlook

Award candidates
The following players were announced to award watch lists prior to the start of the 2011 season:
Braxston Cave – Rimington Trophy
Dayne Crist – Davey O'Brien Award, Maxwell Award
Tyler Eifert – Mackey Award 
Michael Floyd – Biletnikoff Award, Maxwell Award 
Zack Martin – Outland Trophy
David ruffer – Groza Award
Harrison Smith – Nagurski Award, Thorpe Award
Manti Te'o – Bednarik Award, Butkus Award, Lombardi Award, Nagurski Award, 
Cierre Wood – Doak Walker Award

Schedule

Personnel

Coaching staff

Roster

Game summaries

South Florida

 Game Captains: Trevor Robinson, Robert Blanton

Michigan

 Game Captain: Zach Martin

Michigan State

 Game Captain: Ethan Johnson

Pittsburgh

 Game Captain: Taylor Dever

Purdue

 Game Captain: Tyler Eifert

Air Force

 Game Captain: Jonas Gray

USC

 Game Captain: Manti Te'o, Cierre Wood

Navy

Game Captain: Chris Salvi

Source:

Wake Forest

Game Captain: Robert Blanton

Maryland

Game Captain: Darius Fleming

Despite the game being played only 12 miles from the Maryland campus, both end zones read "Notre Dame" and the majority of the fans in attendance were supporting the Fighting Irish. Notre Dame wore their green jerseys along with large green shamrocks on their side of their gold helmets.

Boston College

Stanford

Game Captain: Taylor Dever

Florida State

 

Game Captain: Michael Floyd

Rankings

Awards
National awards

Biletnikoff Award
Michael Floyd (semifinalist)

John Mackey Award
Tyler Eifert (finalist)

All-Americans

References

External links

Notre Dame
Notre Dame Fighting Irish football seasons
Notre Dame Fighting Irish football